Diego Andrés Álvarez Sánchez (born 23 September 1981), known as Diego Álvarez, is a Colombian footballer.

Club career
Álvarez began his career with Independiente Medellín in 2000. He played for San Luis F.C. of Mexico between 2008 and 2009. In 2010, he returned to Colombia to play for Deportivo Cali. He moved to Atlético Nacional in January 2012 and to Atlético Junior in January 2013.

Notes

External links
 
 
 

1981 births
Living people
Footballers from Medellín
Colombian footballers
Colombian expatriate footballers
Categoría Primera A players
Independiente Medellín footballers
San Luis F.C. players
Deportivo Cali footballers
Atlético Nacional footballers
Atlético Junior footballers
Envigado F.C. players
Águilas Doradas Rionegro players
Real Cartagena footballers
Patriotas Boyacá footballers
La Equidad footballers
Deportivo Pereira footballers
Liga MX players
Colombian expatriate sportspeople in Mexico
Expatriate footballers in Mexico
Association football forwards